Argyresthiidae is a family of moths known as the shiny head-standing moths. It was previously treated as a subfamily of Yponomeutidae.

Genera
Argyresthia Hübner, [1825]
Eucalliathla Clarke, 1967
Paraargyresthia Moriuti, 1969

References

External links
Argyresthiidae at Australian Faunal Directory
Argyresthiinae at Bug Guide

Yponomeutidae
Moth families